Openpay Group, commonly referred to by its trading name Openpay, is an Australian fintech company that operates in the "Buy now, pay later" field and provides online financial services such as and post purchase payments. Their core service is designed to allow customers to pay for items purchased using interest-free installments.

History 
Openpay was founded by Yaniv Meydan and Richard Broome in 2013. As opposed to similar 'Buy Now, Pay Later' companies such as Afterpay, Openpay has attempted to focus more on cash flow management on larger purchases in areas such as healthcare, automotive and home improvements. It also provides a software as a service (SaaS) product for business to business clients such as Woolworths to offer trade accounts and management.

Openpay previously expanded to both the United Kingdom and the United States, but departed both markets in 2022.

Openpay collapsed and appointed administrators on 7 February 2023.

References 

Australian companies established in 2013
Financial technology companies